The Thaden Metal Aircraft Company was an American aircraft manufacturer based in San Francisco, California in the late 1920s.

History
The company was founded by Herbert von Thaden in 1928 to design and build a series of all-metal cabin monoplanes.

In 1929 the company was renamed the Pittsburgh Metal Airplane Company when it was bought by the Pittsburgh Aviation Industries Corporation for $100,000. The company failed to break into the commercial market and collapsed, PAIC sold the company to the General Aviation Corporation in 1930 and it was renamed the Metalair Corporation.

Aircraft
Thaden T-1 (1928)
Thaden T-2 (1928)
Thaden T-4 (1930)

See also
Louise Thaden - Herbert Thaden's wife and a pioneer female aviator.

References

Notes

Bibliography

Defunct aircraft manufacturers of the United States